FabricLive.12 is a DJ mix compilation album by Bugz in the Attic, as part of the FabricLive mix series.

Track listing
  Umod – Tromboline – Dominic Stanton
  Kaidi Tatham & Dego – Got Me Puzzled – 2000 Black
  Nutmeg – Bicycle Kick – Neroli
  Focus – Having Your Fun (4 Hero Rework) – Versatile
  Artwork – Red – Big Apple
  Seiji ft Lyric L – Loose Lips – Bitasweet
  Daluq – Oriental Express – Soulja
  Vikter Duplaix – Looking For Love (Bugz in the Attic Remix) – Hollywood
  Nu Design – Time To Skyank – Zed Bias
  dkd – Future Rage – Bitasweet/2000 Black
  Alison David – Dreams Come True (Afronaught Mix) – Fresh Air
  Trouble Man – Strike Hard – Far Out Recordings
  Daft Punk – Harder, Better, Faster, Stronger (The Neptunes Remix) – Virgin
  N'Dambi – Call Me (Re-Edit) – Cheeky Recordings

References

External links
Fabric: FabricLive.12
[ AllMusic: FabricLive.12]

2003 compilation albums
Bugz in the Attic albums